László Gyimesi (born 8 September 1957) is a former Hungarian professional footballer who played as a midfielder. He was a member of the Hungarian national football team. Gyimesi works as an active football coach.

Career 
Gyimesi started playing football for Budapest Honvéd FC in the Hungarian national championship, where he played for 14 years, with a short interruption. Since 1988, he has played for K.R.C. Genk in Belgium, where he finished his active football career in 1992.

National team 
Between 1978 and 1988, Gyimesi played 12 times for the Hungarian national team and scored one goal.

As a coach 
Gyimesi has coached four teams since 1997. These were as follows: Csepel SC, Vác FC, Tököl VSK and Inter 04.

Honours 

 Nemzeti Bajnokság I (NB I)
 Champion: 1979–80, 1983–84, 1984–85, 1985–86, 1987–88
 Magyar Kupa (MNK)
 Winner: 1985
 UEFA Europa League
 Quarter-finals: 1978–79

References 

Hungarian footballers

1957 births
Living people
Hungary international footballers
People from Budapest
Association football midfielders
Hungarian football managers
Budapest Honvéd FC players
Győri ETO FC players
K.R.C. Genk players
Nemzeti Bajnokság I players
Sportspeople from Budapest